Jadoo Teri Nazar is a Marathi play directed by Mangesh Kadam and written by Ratnakar Matkari. The star cast includes Prashant Damle, Manisha Joshi, Shalaka Pawar, Satish Tare.

The play is a romantic comedy musical.

Synopsis
An eye specialist Dr. Pundalik usually counsels his students along with the assistance of Prakash. He is a bachelor who shares a bittersweet relationship with his friend Dr. Purva who happens to be his competition next to his clinic.

One day, someone sells Dr. Pundalik a potion which if used as an eye drop will fall in love with the first person he sets his sight on. Hence begins a hilarious ride of musical journey.

Cast
 Prashant Damle
 Sandeep Pathak
 Shalaka Pawar
 Shyam Ponkshe
 Manisha Joshi
 Satish Tare
 Astad Kale
 Vijay Mishra

Crew
Producer - Sudhir Bhat
Director - Mangesh Kadam
Writer - Ratnakar Matkari
Music Director - Ashok Patki

References

External links
 'IMDB'
 'Official Youtube'

Indian plays
Postmodern plays
Marathi-language plays